Conspiracy theories about the death of Adolf Hitler, dictator of Germany from 1933 to 1945, contradict the accepted fact that he committed suicide in the Führerbunker on 30 April 1945. Stemming from a campaign of Soviet disinformation, most of these theories hold that Hitler and his wife, Eva Braun, survived and escaped from Berlin, with some asserting that he went to South America. In the post-war years, the United States Federal Bureau of Investigation (FBI) and Central Intelligence Agency (CIA) investigated some of the reports, without lending them credence. The 2009 revelation that a skull in the Soviet archives long (dubiously) claimed to be Hitler's actually belonged to a woman has helped fuel conspiracy theories.

While the claims have received some exposure in popular culture, they are regarded by historians and scientific experts as disproven fringe theories. Eyewitnesses and Hitler's dental remains demonstrate that he died in his Berlin bunker in 1945.

Origins

The narrative that Hitler did not commit suicide, but instead escaped Berlin, was first presented to the general public by Marshal Georgy Zhukov at a press conference on 9 June 1945, on orders from Soviet leader Joseph Stalin. That month, 68% of Americans polled thought Hitler was still alive. When asked at the Potsdam Conference in July 1945 how Hitler had died, Stalin said he was either living "in Spain or Argentina." In July 1945, British newspapers repeated comments from a Soviet officer that a charred body discovered by the Soviets was "a very poor double." American newspapers also repeated dubious quotes, such as that of the Russian garrison commandant of Berlin, who claimed that Hitler had "gone into hiding somewhere in Europe." This disinformation, propagated by Stalin's government, has been a springboard for various conspiracy theories, despite the official conclusion by Western powers and the consensus of historians that Hitler killed himself on 30 April 1945. It even caused a minor resurgence in Nazism during the Allied occupation of Germany.

In October 1945, France-Soir quoted Otto Abetz, Nazi ambassador to Vichy France during World War II, as saying that Hitler was not dead. The first detailed investigation by Western powers began that November after Dick White, then head of counter-intelligence in the British sector of Berlin, had their agent Hugh Trevor-Roper investigate the matter to counter the Soviet claims. His findings that Hitler and Braun had died by suicide in Berlin were written in a report in 1946, and published in a book the next year. Regarding the case, Trevor-Roper reflected, "the desire to invent legends and fairy tales... is (greater) than the love of truth". In April 1947, 45% of Americans polled thought Hitler was still alive.

In 1946, an American miner and Baptist preacher named William Henry Johnson began sending out a series of letters under the pen name "Furrier No. 1", claiming to be the living Hitler and to have escaped with Braun to Kentucky. He alleged that tunnels were being dug to Washington, D.C., and that he would engage armies, nuclear bombs and invisible spaceships to take over the universe. Johnson was able to raise up to $15,000 (over $140,000 in 2020 currency), promising lofty incentives to his supporters, before being arrested on charges of mail fraud in mid-1956.

In March 1948, newspapers around the world reported the account of former German lieutenant Arthur F. Mackensen, who claimed that on 5 May 1945 (during the Soviet bombardment of Berlin), he, Hitler, Braun and Martin Bormann had escaped the Führerbunker in tanks. The group allegedly flew from Tempelhof Airport to Tønder, Denmark, where Hitler gave a speech and took a flight with Braun to the coast. In a May 1948 issue of the Italian magazine Tempo, author Emil Ludwig wrote that a double could have been cremated in Hitler's place, allowing him to flee by submarine to Argentina. Presiding judge at the Einsatzgruppen trial at Nuremberg Michael Musmanno wrote in his 1950 book that such theories were "about as rational as to say that Hitler was carried away by angels," citing a lack of evidence, the confirmation of Hitler's dental remains, and the fact that Ludwig had expressly ignored the presence of witnesses in the bunker. In his refutation of Mackensen's account, Musmanno cites a subsequent story of his, in which the lieutenant allegedly flew on 9 May to Málaga, Spain, when he was attacked by 30 Lightning fighters over Marseilles (despite the war having ended in Europe), purportedly killing all 33 passengers besides himself.

From 1951 to 1972, the National Police Gazette, an American tabloid-style magazine, ran a series of stories asserting Hitler's survival. Unproven allegations include that Hitler conceived children with Braun around the late 1930s, that he was actually in prime physical health at the end of World War II, and that he fled to Antarctica or South America. Writing for the Gazette, US intelligence officer William F. Heimlich claimed that the blood found on Hitler's sofa did not match his blood type.

Following decades of other contradictory reports, in 1968 Soviet journalist Lev Bezymenski released his book The Death of Adolf Hitler. It includes a purported Soviet autopsy report which concludes that Hitler died by cyanide poisoning, despite no dissection of internal organs being recorded to confirm this and eyewitness accounts to the contrary. Bezymenski claims that the autopsy reports were not released earlier "in case someone might try to slip into the role of 'the Führer saved by a miracle.'" He later admitted that he was acting as "a typical party propagandist" and intended "to lead the reader to the conclusion that [a gunshot] was a pipe dream or half an invention and that Hitler actually poisoned himself." The book's claims have been widely derided by Western historians.

In 2020, historian Richard J. Evans wrote:

Evidence

At the end of 1945, Stalin ordered a second commission to investigate Hitler's death, in part to investigate rumours of Hitler's survival. On 30 May 1946, part of a skull was found, ostensibly in the crater where Hitler's remains had been exhumed. It consists of part of the occipital bone and part of both parietal bones. The nearly complete left parietal bone has a bullet hole, apparently an exit wound. In 2009, on an episode of History's MysteryQuest, University of Connecticut archaeologist and bone specialist Nick Bellantoni examined the skull fragment, which Soviet officials had believed to be Hitler's. According to Bellantoni, "The bone seemed very thin" for a male, and "the sutures where the skull plates come together seemed to correspond to someone under 40". A small piece detached from the skull was DNA-tested, as was blood from Hitler's sofa. The skull was determined to be that of a woman—providing fodder for conspiracy theorists—while the blood was confirmed to belong to a male.

Neither former Soviet nor Russian officials have claimed the skull was the main piece of evidence, instead citing jawbone fragments and two dental bridges found in May 1945. The items were shown to two associates of Hitler's personal dentist, Hugo Blaschke: his assistant Käthe Heusermann and longtime dental technician Fritz Echtmann. They confirmed that the dental remains were Hitler's and Braun's, as did Blaschke in later statements. According to Ada Petrova and Peter Watson, Hugh Thomas disputed these dental remains in his 1995 book, but also speculated that Hitler probably died in the bunker after being strangled by his valet Heinz Linge. They noted that "even Dr Thomas admits that there is no evidence to support" this theory. Ian Kershaw wrote that "The 'theories' of Hugh Thomas ... that Hitler was strangled by Linge, and that the female body burned was not that of Eva Braun, who escaped from the bunker, belong in fairyland." In 2017, French forensic pathologist Philippe Charlier confirmed that teeth on one of the jawbone fragments were in "perfect agreement" with an  taken of Hitler in 1944. This investigation of the teeth by the French team, the results of which were reported in the European Journal of Internal Medicine in May 2018, found that the dental remains were definitively Hitler's teeth. According to Charlier, "There is no possible doubt. Our study proves that Hitler died in 1945 [in Berlin]."

FBI documents declassified by the 1998 Nazi War Crimes Disclosure Act, which began to be released online by the early 2010s, contain a number of alleged sightings of Hitler in Europe, South America, and the United States, some of which assert that he changed his appearance via plastic surgery or by shaving off his toothbrush moustache. Although some notable individuals speculated that Hitler could have survived, including General of the Army Dwight D. Eisenhower and Lieutenant John F. Kennedy in mid-1945, the documents state that the alleged sightings of Hitler could not be verified. Richard J. Evans notes that the FBI was obliged to document such claims no matter how "erroneous or deranged" they were, while American historian Donald McKale states that their files did not produce any credible indication of Hitler's survival.

In spite of the disinformation from Stalin's government and eyewitness discrepancies, the consensus of historians is that Hitler killed himself on 30 April 1945.

Alleged escape to Argentina

Some works claim that Hitler and Braun did not commit suicide, but actually escaped to Argentina.

Phillip Citroen's claims
A declassified CIA document dated 3 October 1955 reported claims made by a self-proclaimed former German SS trooper named Phillip Citroen that Hitler was still alive, and that he "left Colombia for Argentina around January 1955." Enclosed with the document was an alleged photograph of Citroen and a person he claimed to be Hitler; on the back of the photo was written "Adolf Schüttelmayor" and the year 1954. The report also states that neither the contact who reported his conversations with Citroen, nor the CIA station was "in a position to give an intelligent evaluation of the information". The station chief's superiors told him that "enormous efforts could be expended on this matter with remote possibilities of establishing anything concrete", and the investigation was dropped.

Grey Wolf
The 2011 book Grey Wolf: The Escape of Adolf Hitler by British authors Simon Dunstan and Gerrard Williams, and the 2014 docudrama film by Williams based on it, suggest that a number of  took certain Nazis and Nazi loot to Argentina, where the Nazis were supported by future president Juan Perón, who, with his wife Evita, had been receiving money from the Nazis for some time. As reported claims received by the FBI stated, Hitler allegedly arrived in Argentina, first staying at Hacienda San Ramón (east of San Carlos de Bariloche), then moved to a Bavarian-style mansion at Inalco, a remote and barely accessible spot at the northwest end of Nahuel Huapi Lake, close to the Chilean border. Eva Braun supposedly left Hitler around 1954 and moved to Neuquén with their daughter, Ursula ('Uschi'), while Hitler allegedly died in February 1962. The book passingly asserts that Bormann gave the U.S. Office of Strategic Services stolen art and military secrets in exchange for Hitler's life.

This theory of Hitler's flight to Argentina has been dismissed by historians, including Guy Walters. He has described Dunstan and Williams' theory as "rubbish", adding: "There's no substance to it at all. It appeals to the deluded fantasies of conspiracy theorists and has no place whatsoever in historical research." Walters contended that "it is simply impossible to believe that so many people could keep such a grand scale deception so quiet," and says that no serious historian would give the story any credibility. Historian Richard Evans has many misgivings about the book and subsequent film. For example, he notes that the story about Ursula or 'Uschi' is merely "second-hand hearsay evidence without identification or corroboration." Evans also notes that Dunstan and Williams made extensive use of a book Hitler murió en la Argentina by Manuel Monasterio, which the author later admitted included made up 'strange ramblings', and speculation. Evans contends that Monasterio's book is not to be regarded as a reliable source. In the end, Evans dismisses the survival stories of Hitler as "fantasies". McKale notes that the book repeats many claims made over the preceding decades which are implied by remote association, stating that "[w]hen one has no factual or otherwise reliable proof, one resorts to associating... with something else or to using hearsay and other dubious evidence, including unnamed or unidentified sources."

Hunting Hitler
He and other Nazis then allegedly plotted a "Fourth Reich". Such conspiracy theories of survival and escape have been widely dismissed. Contradictorily, in 2017 the series was praised by the tabloid-style National Police Gazette, which historically was a supporter of the fringe theory, while calling on Russia to allow Hitler's jawbone remains to be DNA-tested. After being featured on the series as an expert on World War II, author James Holland explained that "[I] was very careful never to mention on film that I thought either Hitler or Bormann escaped. Because they didn't."

In popular culture

 In the adventure novel On the World's Roof (1949) by Douglas Valder Duff, a group of escaped Nazi officers with their Leader (purportedly Hitler himself) plan to bombard capital cities around the world with nuclear weapons from their stronghold in Tibet.
 In the 1981 novella The Portage to San Cristobal of A.H. by George Steiner, Hitler survives the end of the war and escapes to the Amazon jungle, where he is found and tried by Nazi-hunters 30 years later. Hitler's defence is that since Israel owes its existence to the Holocaust, he is really the benefactor of the Jews.
In the novel The Berkut (1987), Hitler escapes from Berlin with the intention of reaching South America, but is secretly captured by elite Soviet commandos under Stalin's orders. He is imprisoned in Moscow and later executed.
In a 1995 The Simpsons episode, "Bart vs. Australia", Bart Simpson makes a call to Buenos Aires, which is received by an elderly Adolf Hitler.
 In the 1999 video game Persona 2: Innocent Sin, a rumor is spread that Hitler was saved by elite soldiers and fled with those soldiers to Antarctica, resulting in this "Last Battalion" taking over Sumaru City. Unlike most depictions of Hitler's survival beyond 1945, this is not actually true within the story's context; the story concerns rumors becoming reality, and the "Hitler" the party fights turns out to be Nyarlathotep in disguise.
 In the CGI anime film Lupin III: The First (2019), Interpol spreads a fake rumor stating that Hitler is alive and living in Brazil, in order to lure his fanatical Ahnenerbe followers out of hiding.
 In the 2020 Amazon Prime TV-series Hunters, it is discovered in 1977 that Adolf Hitler and Eva Braun are living in Argentina.

References
Informational notes

Citations

Bibliography
 
 
 
 
 
 
 
 
 
 
 
 
 
 

Further reading

External links
 FBI documents containing alleged sightings of Hitler

1945 in Germany
Hitler, Adolf
Death of Adolf Hitler
Nazis in South America
Views on Adolf Hitler

fr:Derniers jours d'Adolf Hitler#Rumeurs sur la fuite d'Hitler